Liolaemus erguetae is a species of lizard in the family  Liolaemidae. It is native to Chile and Bolivia.

References

erguetae
Reptiles described in 1995
Reptiles of Chile
Reptiles of Bolivia
Taxa named by Raymond Laurent